The Blue Pearl is a 1920 American silent mystery film directed by George Irving and starring Edith Hallor, Lumsden Hare and Earl Schenck. It is based on the 1918 play of the same title by Anne Crawford Flexner.

Cast
 Edith Hallor as Laura Webb
 Lumsden Hare as Holland Webb
 Earl Schenck as Penrose Trent
 John Halliday as Richard Drake 
 Corliss Giles as Wilfred Scott
 D.J. Flanagan as Frederick Thurston
 H. Cooper Cliffe as Major Topping
 Faire Binney as Angelica Topping
 Florence Billings as Sybil Trent

References

Bibliography
Ken Wlaschin. Silent Mystery and Detective Movies: A Comprehensive Filmography. McFarland, 2009.

External links
 

1920 films
1920 mystery films
American silent feature films
American mystery films
Films directed by George Irving
1920s English-language films
1920s American films
Silent mystery films